Granite Flat is a locality in the local government area of the Shire of Buloke, Victoria, Australia. Its post office opened in 1902, and was closed on 27 March 1908.

References